Wintringham is a village and civil parish in the Ryedale district of North Yorkshire, England. It was part of the East Riding of Yorkshire until 1974.

Location
Two long-distance footpaths, the Yorkshire Wolds Way National Trail and the Centenary Way, pass through. The former Anglican parish church of St Peter's has its own page. It has been redundant as a church since 2004.

Diarist
The deserted hamlet of Linton, to the south-east, was the probable birthplace of Lady Margaret Hoby, author of the earliest extant diary of a woman in English.

References

External links

Villages in North Yorkshire
Civil parishes in North Yorkshire